Trevor B. Sim (born June 9, 1970) is a Canadian former professional ice hockey forward who played most of his career in minor leagues.

Sim was born in Calgary, Alberta. He played junior hockey for four different Western Hockey League teams and was part of the Swift Current Broncos team that won the 1989 Memorial Cup.  He was selected by the Edmonton Oilers in the third round of the 1988 NHL Entry Draft, and made his National Hockey League debut in the 1989–90 season.  Sim played in only three games with the Oilers and scored one assist. He was assigned to the minor league affiliate Cape Breton Oilers for the following season.

Sim played for the Canada national men's ice hockey team from 1992–94 and participated  in the 1994 Winter Olympics.   He spent the remainder of his career playing for teams in the AHL, ECHL, and IHL.

Career statistics

Regular season and playoffs

External links

1970 births
Living people
Canadian expatriate ice hockey players in the United States
Canadian ice hockey forwards
Cape Breton Oilers players
Charlotte Checkers (1993–2010) players
Edmonton Oilers draft picks
Edmonton Oilers players
Kamloops Blazers players
Milwaukee Admirals players
New Orleans Brass players
Orlando Solar Bears (IHL) players
Raleigh IceCaps players
Regina Pats players
Seattle Thunderbirds players
Ice hockey people from Calgary
Swift Current Broncos players
Syracuse Crunch players
Winston-Salem Thunderbirds players